Michael James Baumgartner (born December 13, 1975) is an American politician and diplomat serving as the 28th Spokane County Treasurer. A member of the Republican Party, he previously served as a member of the Washington State Senate, representing the 6th district from 2011 to 2019 and was his party's nominee in the 2012 election for the United States Senate, unsuccessfully challenging Democratic incumbent Maria Cantwell.

Early life, education, and career

Baumgartner was born in Pullman. His mother is a kindergarten teacher and his father was a professor of Forestry and Natural Resource Sciences. After graduating from Pullman High School, he earned a scholarship to attend Washington State University. There, he was awarded a Thomas Foley scholarship, and was named a Stephenson scholar, an award given to the top graduates from the Honors College. He graduated in 1999 with a degree in economics with minors in French and mathematics. In 2002, he earned a master's degree in public administration from Harvard University.

During the Iraq War, he served as the economics officer in the Office of Joint Strategic Planning & Assessment (JSPA) at the United States Embassy in Baghdad, helping the Iraqi government as part of the Baghdad Security Plan, receiving accolades from then General David Petraeus as well as Ambassador Ryan Crocker. In 2008, he spent 7 months working as a civilian contractor in the Helmand Province of Afghanistan. That same year, the Boston Globe referred to Baumgartner as the "Architect of Hope" in the Middle East.

Michael and his wife Eleanor met while working in Afghanistan, and were married in 2010. They have three sons and one daughter. In early 2018, they lost their fifth baby after suffering a late miscarriage.

Washington State Senate

Baumgartner represented parts of the City of Spokane, Airway Heights, and Cheney including Eastern Washington University. (map)

Elections
In late 2009, Baumgartner decided to run against Democratic State Senate Majority Whip Chris Marr for the Washington State Senate, 6th Legislative District seat. On August 17, 2010, in the state primary election, Baumgartner defeated Marr with 53% of the vote. In the November election, he officially defeated Marr with 54% of the vote. The election battle between Marr and Baumgartner is considered one of the most hotly contested and expensive state legislative races in Washington state history.

During his campaign for state senate, Baumgartner said he would not support a woman's right to terminate a pregnancy in cases of rape. In that same year, Baumgartner signed the Spokane County Republican Party Platform which called for the privatizing of Social Security, the abolition of the United States Department of Education, the withdrawal of the United States from the United Nations, withdrawal of the United States from the World Trade Organization, and the abolition of the Bureau of Alcohol, Tobacco, Firearms, and Explosives.

Tenure
During his tenure as Washington State Senator, Baumgartner has sponsored keynote legislation such as an amendment to the Washington State Senate to rise Higher Education to the State's #2 focus, reorganizing and streamlining central service functions, powers, and duties of the State Government, and reforming the rule-making process for State Economic Policy (the latter two receiving 47–0 votes in the State Senate).

In 2012 Baumgartner was named one of the National Federation of Independent Business's Guardians of Business, the highest award they offer, in recognition of his votes that side "100 Percent" with small businesses. The Association of Washington Business has awarded him their 'Cornerstone Award' also, in recognition of his support for employers, economic development, and business-related issues in the Washington State Legislature.

Committee assignments
In 2011 and 2012, Baumgartner was the ranking minority member of the Economic Development Trade & Innovation Committee, served on the Ways & Means Committee, and the Higher Education & Workforce Development Committee.

In 2013, two Democrats joined with the 23 Republicans to form the Majority Coalition Caucus. With the new coalition, Baumgartner was named Vice-Chairman of the Senate Ways and Means Committee, and was also assigned to the Senate Trade and Economic Development Committee, the Higher Education Committee, and the Human Services and Corrections Committee.

2012 U.S. Senate election

In October 2011, Baumgartner decided to challenge incumbent U.S. Senator Maria Cantwell (D-WA). Cantwell was running for her third term. Washington uses a "top-two" nonpartisan blanket primary system, in which the top two candidates of any party in the primary election advance to the general election. Cantwell and Baumgartner finished first and second, respectively, and competed in the general election.

Baumgartner has formally endorsed Washington Initiative 502 to legalize, regulate and tax marijuana for adults 21 and over, making him the first and only candidate for statewide office in Washington state to do so, and taking a position that wasn't popular in his party.

In the November general election, Cantwell defeated Baumgartner. Cantwell received over 60% of the vote, to Baumgarter's 40%.

Spokane County Treasurer

In 2018, Baumgartner opted not to run for reelection to the State Senate. Instead, he chose to run for Spokane County Treasurer. He won the November election and took office in January 2019.

Notable achievements and votes 
Spokane's north–south freeway: Baumgartner fought to secure the $900 million funding needed to complete the north–south corridor route first proposed sixty years ago, and was the sole local Republican to support the major transportation package.

WSU's new medical school: Baumgartner helped lead successful efforts for a new medical school in Spokane, helping address physician shortages in underserved areas of eastern Washington, and boosting healthcare economy jobs growth. Baumgartner introduced legislation to overturn a 100-year-old law that had given the University of Washington a monopoly on training doctors in the state.

Charter schools: Baumgartner has consistently fought for charter schools, in the face of determined opposition from the Washington State teachers’ union WEA.

Transparency: In February 2018 Senator Baumgartner was one of a handful of Washington State legislators to vote against a bill that would have exempted legislators from public records rules.

Calls for reform of student conduct process: In 2016, Baumgartner took an outspoken stand against the expulsion of an American Samoan student, Robert Barber, from Washington State University. Barber had been only one credit short of a college degree when he was accused of involvement in a brawl. Baumgartner told a meeting of WSU regents: "If you don’t fix this, I goddamn will." Barber was reinstated to the student body, and was later found innocent of all criminal charges.

Concluding the 2018 legislative session, Baumgartner introduced a satirical resolution calling for April 1 to be celebrated as "Governor Jay Inslee Integrity Day", mocking the Governor for his about-turn on vetoing public records legislation.

Champion of Freedom: In 2018, the Washington Policy Center think-tank announced that Senator Baumgartner would be presented with their prestigious "Champion of Freedom" award, in recognition "for his outstanding commitment to free-market principles, worker rights and limited government, particularly in advancing labor reform in our state. WPC’s board chose Sen. Baumgartner for this award in recognition of his unwavering principled stand on numerous key during his many years in the State Senate."

Awards 
 2014 Guardians of Small Business award. Presented by NFIB.

References

External links
 Michael Baumgartner for Senate official campaign site
 
 
 Campaign contributions at OpenSecrets.org

21st-century American politicians
1975 births
American expatriates in Iraq
Harvard Kennedy School alumni
Living people
People from Pullman, Washington
Politicians from Spokane, Washington
Republican Party Washington (state) state senators